Rauf Israfil oglu Atakishiyev was a Soviet Azerbaijani singer, pianist, singer-soloist, People's Artist of the Azerbaijan SSR (1967), professor (1972).

Biography
Rauf Atakishiyev was born on July 15, 1925, in Goychay, Azerbaijan. In 1943, he was admitted to the Azerbaijan State Conservatoire. From 1946, he studied at the Moscow State Conservatoire specialising in fortepiano taught by Konstantin Igumnov, as well as in vocal arts taught by Antonina Nezhdanova. In 1952, after  finishing his graduate studies, he returned to Baku and began performing as pianist and solo singer at the Opera and Ballet Theatre. From 1953, he began teaching at the Azerbaijan State Conservatoire. Beginning in 1969, he headed the faculty of fortepiano. In 1967, Atakishiyev was awarded the title of the People's Artist of the Azerbaijan. In 1972, he was given a professor's degree of the Azerbaijan State Conservatoire. Atakishiyev was awarded the Jubilee Medal of Lenin, the Order of Friendship of Peoples, as well as honorary diplomas of the Presidium of the Supreme Soviet of the USSR and the Moldavian SSR. Atakishiyev died on February 3, 1994.

References

1925 births
1994 deaths
Azerbaijani classical pianists
People's Artists of the USSR
People's Artists of Azerbaijan
Soviet Azerbaijani people
Baku Academy of Music alumni
20th-century classical pianists